The crank machine was a penal labour device used in England in the 19th century. It consisted of a hand-turned crank which forced four large cups or ladles through sand inside a drum, doing nothing useful. 

The prisoner would typically be forced to do 6,000–14,400 revolutions over the period of six hours per day (1.5–3.6 seconds per revolution). The prison warden could make the task harder by tightening an adjusting screw.

In 1895, there were 29 crank machines in use, but by 1901 there were only 5.

See also
 Penal treadmill

References

Bibliography 

Ethically disputed judicial practices
Penal labour